Jun Tonosaki (外崎潤), born January 9, 1984, is a Japanese professional ice hockey Defenceman currently playing for the Nippon Paper Cranes of the Asia League.

Since 2005 (the beginning of his professional career), he plays for the Nippon Paper Cranes. He also has played for the Japan national team since the year 2006.

References
Jun Tonosaki 's profile
Cranes's players profile

1984 births
Sportspeople from Sapporo
Japanese ice hockey defencemen
Living people
Asian Games medalists in ice hockey
Asian Games gold medalists for Japan
Asian Games silver medalists for Japan
Ice hockey players at the 2007 Asian Winter Games
Ice hockey players at the 2011 Asian Winter Games
Medalists at the 2007 Asian Winter Games
Medalists at the 2011 Asian Winter Games